Dominique Cottrez is a French woman who admitted killing 8 of her newborn infants.

Murders 

Cottrez committed the murders during an approximately 17-year period between 1989 and 2006. She suffocated eight of her children shortly after giving birth. Cottrez was able to conceal her pregnancies from her husband and doctor due to her weight. She buried the bodies in gardens at her home and her parent's home.

In July 2010, two of the bodies were discovered in plastic bags by new owners working in the garden of a house Dominique and her husband, Pierre-Marie Cottrez, previously occupied. When police contacted the Cottrez family to question them about the discoveries, Dominique immediately admitted that the bodies belonged to two infants she had given birth to. She also told police that six more infants' bodies were hidden in the garage.

Trial 

French prosecutors announced on July 29, 2010 that Dominique had been indicted on murder charges. Her husband was questioned by a judge but has not been charged at this time. Prosecutors believe he may have been unaware of the infants because Dominique's obesity concealed the pregnancies.

In August 2012, Dominique was released by an appeals court in the town of Douai on condition that she continue to receive psychological and psychiatric care.

On July 2, 2015 Dominique was found guilty and sentenced to nine years in prison on eight counts of infanticide.

Dominique and Pierre-Marie Cottrez are also the parents of two adult daughters.

See also
 Infanticide
 Véronique Courjault
 Celine Lesage
 List of French serial killers

References 

French female serial killers
French murderers of children
Living people
People from Nord (French department)
Year of birth missing (living people)